The Women's 200m freestyle event at the 2010 South American Games was held on March 28, with the heats at 10:54 and the Final at 18:15.

Medalists

Records

Results

Heats

Final

References
Heats
Final

Freestyle 200m W